Voto is a municipality in Cantabria, Spain.

References

 

Municipalities in Cantabria